Adafenoxate is a compound related to centrophenoxine, that has been found to act as a nootropic in rats.

Synthesis

Ex 1: 4-Chlorophenoxyacetic acid (pCPA) [122-88-3] is converted to its acid chloride to give 4-chlorophenoxyacetyl chloride [4122-68-3] (1). Esterification with 2-(1-adamantylamino)ethanol [3716-66-3] (2) gives Adafenoxate (3) in a single step.

Ex 2: Same as above but Fischer–Speier esterification done via a DS-trap. This gives an 88% yield.

References

Adamantanes
Chloroarenes
Cholinergics
Amines
Nootropics
Phenoxyacetic acids